Kundalila Falls is a waterfall on the Kaombe River in Zambia. It falls over the lip of the Muchinga escarpment and makes a waterfall near the small town of Kanona in the Serenje District.  It is set in the wilderness on the edge of the Muchinga escarpment.  It is the only waterfall of such grandeur that is set so high on the escarpment. The name 'Kundalila Falls' means "crying dove" in the local Bemba language.

From top of the falls there are views over the Luangwa Valley which is part of the Albertine Rift, the western branch of the East African Rift.  In multiple stages the Kaombe River drops approximately 80m from the escarpment. At the foot of the fall is a natural deep pool surrounded by wild flowers. Visitors are allowed to swim and are encouraged to camp and picnic at the site.

Kundalila Falls is one of the official Zambian Natural Monuments.

Location
GPS coordinates:
 Turning off the T2 at (Kanona): 
 Kundalila Falls:   
Directions:
 On the T2 "Great North Road" is Kanona, where there is a junction signposted "Kundalila Falls 14km - National Monument" (GPS above). After 500m the gravel road crosses the TAZARA railway tracks and the falls are at the end of the road.

References and Web Links 
 Zambia's waterfall Wonderland: http://www.zambiatourism.com/travel/places/waterfalls.htm
 World of Waterfalls: http://www.world-of-waterfalls.com/africa-kundalila-falls.html
 Bradt Travel Guides: http://www.zambia-travel-guide.com/bradt_guide.asp?bradt=665
Open Africa: http://www.openafrica.org/experiences/participant/1598-kundalila-falls

Waterfalls of Zambia
Geography of Central Province, Zambia
Tourist attractions in Central Province, Zambia